The Wigan Warriors are an English professional rugby league club based in Wigan, Greater Manchester. The club was formed in 1872, and was a founder member of the Northern Rugby Football Union in 1895.

The club is the most successful in the history of British rugby league, winning 21 league championships (four in the Super League era), the Challenge Cup 20 times (including eight consecutive wins between 1988 and 1995) and the World Club Challenge four times. The club has also only been relegated once in its history (in 1979–80).

Seasons

Pre-Super League era

Super League era

Notes

Bibliography
 
 
 

 
Wigan Warriors
British rugby league lists